Bernardo González (7 September 1969 – 6 October 2000) was a Spanish cyclist. He competed at the 1988 Summer Olympics and the 1996 Summer Olympics.

References

External links
 

1969 births
2000 deaths
Spanish male cyclists
Olympic cyclists of Spain
Cyclists at the 1988 Summer Olympics
Cyclists at the 1996 Summer Olympics
Cyclists from the Region of Murcia